Houdini is a 2013 stage play about the life of the magician and escapologist Harry Houdini and his brother Theo Houdini, played by BAFTA winner Stuart Brennan, co-starring with Harry's then-wife Evanna Lynch and Jamie Nichols as Harry Houdini.

It premiered in a UK & Ireland tour in September 2013, produced by Theatre Giant and directed by Peter Snee.

Story 
The play follows the brothers Theo and Harry Houdini, as they set out on the road to fame and fortune as the magicians 'The Brothers Houdini'. The play opens at Coney Island, where Harry meets and quickly marries Bess. When Theo makes a mistake at a big performance, Harry is offered the opportunity to do a solo show. As Theo and Harry part ways, the shadow of one brother will consume the other and the play charts the success and failures, the love, drama, pain and tragedy of the two men.

Illusions 
The play features a number of illusions throughout, including:
 The Chinese Water Torture Cell
 The Bullet Catch (performed by Theo)
 The Metamorphosis

Original tour 
The original tour went to the following venues, playing a week long run at each:
 The Blackpool Grand
 The Theatre Royal Windsor
 Stoke Repertory Theatre
 The Gaiety Theatre, Dublin
 The Swansea Grand

Original cast 
The original cast were:
 Theo Houdini - Stuart Brennan 
 Bess Houdini - Evanna Lynch
 Harry Houdini - Jamie Nichols
 Martin Beck - Mark Lyminster
 Douglas Geoffrey - Ion Ridge
 Charlie Chaplin - Mark Wake
 Mime/Stage Hand - Javan Hirst
 Student/Stage Hand - Michael Chase
 Rose - Sophie Attwood
 Medium - Sarah Dungworth
 Policeman/Student - Cieron Joyce

Original creatives 
 Writer - Stuart Brennan
 Director - Peter Snee
 Assistant Director - Preece Killick
 Magic Advisor - Andrew Van Buren
 Sound Design - Dafydd Gough
 Original Score - Tord Brudevoll
 Stage Manager - Julia Nimmo & Adam Gray

Original rehearsals 
Rehearsals took place at the University of Winchester, over four weeks.

References

2013 plays
Cultural depictions of Harry Houdini
British plays